The Peel Z-1 Glider Boat, also called the Peel Flying Boat,  is an American biplane, two-seats-in-tandem, flying boat glider that was designed and produced by the Peel Glider Boat Company, starting in about 1930.

Design and development
The Glider Boat was intended as a strictly recreational aircraft, to be towed from the water surface by a powered boat. The company intended to produce a very inexpensive aircraft to cash in on the sudden popularity of aviation following Charles Lindbergh’s 1927 solo flight across the Atlantic Ocean.

The aircraft is of mixed construction. The  span wing has a wooden spar, steel ribs and is covered in doped aircraft fabric covering. The lower wing tips feature wingtip floats. The hull is made from duralumin and features a stepped shape, similar to most powered flying boats. The aircraft has conventional aircraft controls and was delivered without instruments.

The aircraft was normally launched by a tow rope attached to the glider by a "Y" shaped bridle, with release hooks on both sides of the front cockpit.

The aircraft was placed in quantity production and sold for US$595 each. Thirty were built before the company went out of business in the Great Depression.

Operational history
In August 2011 there were no Peel Glider Boats left on the US Federal Aviation Administration aircraft registry.

Aircraft on display
Cradle of Aviation Museum
EAA AirVenture Museum
National Soaring Museum

Specifications (Glider Boat)

See also

References

External links
Photo of a Peel Glider Boat in the Cradle of Aviation Museum

1930s United States sailplanes
Biplanes
Flying boats
Aircraft first flown in 1930